Bornesitol is a cyclitol. It can be found in the gentianaceae and menyanthaceae plant families.  Chemically, it is a methyl ether of D-myo-inositol.

References 

Cyclitols